Little Heroes is a 1987 science fiction novel by American author Norman Spinrad.

Plot
In the near-future, a music conglomerate called Muzik Inc. hires Glorianna O'Toole, the "Crazy Old Lady of Rock and Roll", who never made it as a rock star but who was present at rock and roll's creation, and two young computer geniuses, to create a fleshless, Artificial Personality rock-and-roll star.

References

External links
Goodreads

1987 American novels
1987 science fiction novels
American science fiction novels
Dystopian novels
Cyberpunk novels
Novels about music
Novels set in the future
Novels by Norman Spinrad